Shaw-Cude House is a historic home located near Colfax, Guilford County, North Carolina. It consists of two principal sections: a single-pen, -story log structure with an exterior end chimney, probably erected between 1790 and 1800; and the larger -story block, of brick construction, probably built about 1809.  The house incorporates Late Georgian and Greek Revival style design elements and embodies stylistic elements of Quaker architecture.

It was listed on the National Register of Historic Places in 1982.

References

Houses on the National Register of Historic Places in North Carolina
Georgian architecture in North Carolina
Greek Revival houses in North Carolina
Houses completed in 1790
Houses in Guilford County, North Carolina
National Register of Historic Places in Guilford County, North Carolina